Yi Insang (1710–1760) was a painter and a government officer in the late Joseon period. 
Yi Insang was born to a high class and grandson of Yi Gyeongyeo who served as Yeonguijeong (prime minister). He worked as a government officer, Hyeongam of Eumjuk. At 42, Yi retired from the government officer and devoted to painting, poetry and calligraphy.

See also
Korean painting
List of Korean painters
Korean art
Korean culture

External links
Brief biography and gallery (in Korean)

1710 births
1760 deaths
18th-century Korean writers
18th-century Korean painters